The UMTS channels are communication channels used by third generation (3G) wireless Universal Mobile Telecommunications System (UMTS) networks.
 UMTS channels can be divided into three levels:
 Physical
 Transport
 Logical

List

See also 
 UMTS
 High Speed Packet Access
 3GPP Long Term Evolution (aka 4G/LTE)

References

Sources
 3GPP specification series 25—Radio aspects of 3G, including UMTS
 TS 25.101 User Equipment (UE) radio transmission and reception (FDD)
 TS 25.201 Description—Describes basic differences between FDD and TDD.
 TS 25.211_PHYSICAL channels and mapping of transport channels onto physical channels (FDD)
 TS 25.212 Multiplexing and channel coding (FDD)
 TS 25.213 Spreading and modulation (FDD)
 TS 25.214 Physical layer procedures (FDD)
 TS 25.215 Physical layer - Measurements (FDD)
 TS 25.301 Radio interface protocol architecture

UMTS